Haplopeza is a genus of beetles in the family Carabidae, containing the following species:

 Haplopeza bicolor Burgeon, 1937
 Haplopeza umtalia Barker, 1919
 Haplopeza violacea Boheman, 1848

References

Platyninae